Elephantomyia is a genus of crane fly in the family Limoniidae.

Species

Subgenus Elephantomyia Osten Sacken, 1860

Subgenus Elephantomyina Alexander, 1938
E. supernumeraria Alexander, 1921

Subgenus Elephantomyodes Alexander, 1923

Subgenus Xenoelephantomyia Alexander, 1965
E. penai Alexander, 1965

References

Limoniidae
Nematocera genera